South Bay Shores is a water park located at California's Great America amusement park in Santa Clara, California. The water park is owned and operated by Cedar Fair and opened as Crocodile Dundee's Boomerang Bay in 2004. The name was shortened to Boomerang Bay in 2007. For the 2021 season, it was expanded and renamed South Bay Shores.

History

Crocodile Dundee's Boomerang Bay opened in 2004 as the first water park in Northern California to be included within an amusement park. Following Cedar Fair's purchase of Paramount Parks properties in 2006, which included California's Great America, the name of the water park was shortened to Boomerang Bay for the 2007 season.

On August 8, 2019, California's Great America announced that Boomerang Bay would be renamed South Bay Shores and expanded for the 2020 season with several new additions, including a six-slide complex, eight kiddie slides, and other amenities within the complex. The park did not operate in 2020 or in the first half of the 2021 season due to the COVID-19 pandemic.

In 2022, Cedar Fair sold the land occupied by the park to Prologis, announcing intentions to permanently close Great America by 2033. Cedar Fair stated that the sale will help them lower the company's corporate debt to $2 billion.

List of attractions

Note: Number ratings assigned per California's Great America, while the colors are unique to Wikipedia. For more details, refer to the California's Great America Guest Assistance Guide.

References

External links
 

Water parks in California
Cedar Fair water parks
2004 establishments in California